Thomas Thynne may refer to:

 Thomas Thynne (died 1625), English MP for Heytesbury, 1593
 Thomas Thynne (died 1639) (c. 1578–1639), English landowner and member of parliament
 Thomas Thynne (died 1669) (1610–1669), English member of parliament, son of above
 Thomas Thynne (died 1682) (1647/8–1682), English landowner and member of parliament, son of above
 Thomas Thynne, 1st Viscount Weymouth (1640–1714), English peer
 Thomas Thynne, 2nd Viscount Weymouth (1710–1751), English peer
 Thomas Thynne, 1st Marquess of Bath (1734–1796), English peer
 Thomas Thynne, 2nd Marquess of Bath (1765–1837), English peer
 Thomas Thynne, 5th Marquess of Bath (1862–1946), English peer
 Thomas Thynne, Viscount Weymouth (1796–1837), English nobleman and member of parliament